Leslie "Les" Chamberlain (10 February 1934 – 2 March 2015) was an English professional rugby league footballer who played in the 1950s and 1960s.

Background
Les Chamberlain's birth was registered in Leeds North district, West Riding of Yorkshire, England, and he died aged 81 in Leeds, West Yorkshire, England.

Playing career

Championship final appearances
Les Chamberlain played right-, i.e. number 12, in Wakefield Trinity's 3–27 defeat by Wigan in the Championship Final during the 1959–60 season at Odsal Stadium, Bradford on Saturday 21 May 1960.

County League appearances
Les Chamberlain played in Wakefield Trinity's victories in Yorkshire County League during the 1958–59 season and 1959–60 season.

Challenge Cup Final appearances
Les Chamberlain played left-, i.e. number 11 (replacing the injured Malcolm Sampson) in the 38–5 victory over Hull F.C. in the 1959–60 Challenge Cup Final during the 1959–60 season at Wembley Stadium, London on Saturday 14 May 1960.

County Cup Final appearances
Les Chamberlain played  in Wakefield Trinity's 23–5 victory over Hunslet in the 1956–57 Yorkshire County Cup Final during the 1956–57 season at Headingley Rugby Stadium, Leeds on Saturday 20 October 1956, played right-, i.e. number 12, in the 20–14 defeat by Leeds in the 1958–59 Yorkshire County Cup Final during the 1958–59 season at Odsal Stadium, Bradford on Saturday 18 October 1958, played right-, i.e. number 10, in the 16–10 victory over Huddersfield in the 1960–61 Yorkshire County Cup Final during the 1960–61 season at Headingley Rugby Stadium, Leeds on Saturday 29 October 1960, and played , i.e. number 11 or 12, in Leeds 2–18 defeat by Wakefield Trinity in the 1964–65 Yorkshire County Cup Final during the 1964–64 season at Fartown Ground, Huddersfield on Saturday 31 October 1964.

Notable tour matches
Les Chamberlain played , in Wakefield Trinity's 17–12 victory over Australia in the 1956–57 Kangaroo tour of Great Britain and France match at Belle Vue, Wakefield on Monday 10 December 1956.

Club career
Les Chamberlain made his début for Wakefield Trinity playing  in the 20–8 victory over Dewsbury at Belle Vue, Wakefield on Saturday 24 December 1955, scored 2-tries against Huddersfield at Belle Vue, Wakefield during Easter 1956, and played for the 'A' Team when they won a League and Cup double during the 1955–56 season, he was being considered for Yorkshire when he suffered a broken leg against Workington Town Saturday 18 October 1958, he made his return a year later against Batley in October 1959, he played his last match for Wakefield Trinity in the 8–15 defeat by Leeds at Belle Vue, Wakefield on Saturday 29 April 1961, and made his début for Leeds against Widnes at Naughton Park, Widnes on Saturday 7 December 1963.

Contemporaneous Article Extract
"Les Chamberlain, a product of Leeds and District Amateur R.L., made his senior début in December 1955. A broken leg halted his career in October, 1958 and he took no part in senior football during the following season. He came back into our pack in October, 1959, and played in our Wembley side and also in the N.R.L. Championship Final. Last season, mainly at  forward, he made 25 appearances. His full playing record with us is:- Appearances 110. Tries 14. Points 42."

Genealogical information
Les Chamberlain's marriage to Lily (née Geary) (birth registered second ¼  in Wakefield district) was registered during fourth ¼ 1959 in Wakefield district. They had children; Garry J. Chamberlain (birth registered during third ¼  in Lower Agbrigg district), Neil L. Chamberlain (birth registered during July→December  in Leeds district), Micheal Anthony Chamberlain (birth registered during third ¼  in Leeds district), and Mark Andrew Chamberlain (birth registered during second ¼  in Leeds district). Les Chamberlain's wife Lily is the youngest sister of Molly who married Stanley Smith, and Peggy who married Albert Firth.

References

External links
Search for "Chamberlain" at rugbyleagueproject.org
 Frank Foster at eraofthebiff.com
Les Chamberlain RIP
Tributes paid to Wakefield Trinity legends
(archived by web.archive.org) Les Chamberlain Obituary
Wakefield mourn passing of Les Chamberlain
Rugby League Cup Final 1960

1934 births
2015 deaths
Bramley RLFC players
English rugby league players
Hull Kingston Rovers players
Leeds Rhinos players
Place of death missing
Rugby league players from Leeds
Rugby league props
Rugby league second-rows
Rugby league locks
Wakefield Trinity players